Cleanse Fold and Manipulate is the third studio album by Canadian electro-industrial group Skinny Puppy.  The album was released in 1987 and was supported by a single, "Addiction". The album was further supported by the Head Trauma tour, which spanned across North America and Europe. Ain't it Dead Yet?, a recording of the group performing in Toronto, Ontario, Canada, was released on video in 1989 and CD in 1991.

Music
Cleanse Fold and Manipulate explores a number of different topics concerning medicine, society, and politics. The song "First Aid" addresses what was the growing AIDS epidemic of the 1980s, while "Second Tooth" concerns with the struggles faced by Vietnam War veterans, namely post-traumatic stress. The song "Deep Down Trauma Hounds" was written following a string of teenage suicides in the United States. Nivek Ogre, the group's vocalist and songwriter, said of the suicides:

Other songs on the album pay homage to horror films. The song "The Mourn" is based on the Japanese extreme horror movie Flower of Flesh and Blood from the Guinea Pig film series. According to the group, the film was the closest they had ever come to seeing what they felt was a real snuff movie. Footage from the film has since been used in their live shows.

Release
Cleanse Fold and Manipulate was released on June 25, 1987. Eyeball paperweights were distributed by Capitol Records to help promote the album. The record sold 80,000 copies by October 1988, with 90 percent of sales being outside Canada.

Critical reception 

Tim DiGravina of Allmusic said the album was "hard to recommend". He went on to say while it did contain one of the band's best songs, "Deep Down Trauma Hounds", much of the album was ambient and fragmentary. Still, he added, "fans of industrial music will appreciate the album's formidable beats and coarse sound samples that seem to be generated from warping the sounds of heavy machinery. Perhaps more than other any place in Skinny Puppy's discography, Ogre's vocals work like spoken-word stream-of-conscious dementia, with more emphasis on evil tones than on any relation to their music". He concluded by saying the album was primarily recommendable to die hard fans. Evelyn Erskine from the Ottawa Citizen gave the album a favorable review, saying the album was "dark and frightening", and described the flow of its songs as "cinematic". Erskine remarked that the album was weakened by the band's overreliance on gothic horror elements. Billboard magazine recommended the album, calling it "the right combination of gloom-and-doom lyrics and throbbing, metallic music".

People magazine said listening to the album was "like stepping into a nightmare being experienced by the Phantom of the Opera" and concluded that the band was "too garish for extended exposure but, in small doses, they are extremely powerful". Mike Saunders of the Sun-Sentinel thought the album was an intriguing accomplishment, but that the initial "voyeuristic thrill" received from listening wears off before the album ends. Frances Litman from the Times Colonist thought the album was tamer than the band's previous work and only recommended it to club-goers.

Track listing

Additional notes 
To promote the album, Capitol Records (who were responsible for the release of Skinny Puppy music outside of Canada) distributed eyeball paperweights.
Cleanse Fold and Manipulate is a cyclical album: the end of  track 10, "Epilogue", segues into the beginning of track 1, "First Aid."
In response to the cover's source image by Gilmore: "It is an image from the original 1960s movie of Village Of The Damned. There is a little tongue-in-cheek history behind using that image as the manager for Images In Vogue, a band that C. Key used to be in before Skinny Puppy, was a former child model from England and had a role in the movie. But the face on the cover was another child actor from the movie."
"Draining Faces" was featured on The Blair Witch Project soundtrack.

Personnel 
All information from Allmusic.

Musicians 
 Nivek Ogre – voices, lyrics, objects, audio sculpture 
 cEvin Key – synthesizers, guitar, drums, bass, voices, lyrics, sampling, sequencing, sounds, objects, radio, tapes, sequencers 
 Dwayne Goettel – synthesizers, guitar, drums, background vocals sampling, tape, sequencing, radio, sequencers , synthesizers, guitar, drums, bass, voices, lyrics, sampling, sequencing, sounds, objects, radio, tapes, sequencers and set ALL the input of Crompton a.k.a. cEvin Key to entropy.
 Peter Rave – guitar

Production 
 Producers – cEvin Key, Dave Ogilvie
 Engineers – cEvin Key, Dave Ogilvie
 Mastering – Pete Norman 
 Cover artwork  – Steven R. Gilmore

References 

1987 albums
Skinny Puppy albums
Nettwerk Records albums